Aleksey Ivanovich Abrikosov (– 9 April 1955) was a Russian/Soviet pathologist and a member of the Soviet Academy of Sciences (since 1939) and the Soviet Academy of Medical Sciences (since 1944).

Early life
Aleksey Abrikosov was born into a wealthy family of factory owners, who were the official suppliers of chocolate confections to the Russian Imperial Court. His grandfather was the industrialist Aleksei Ivanovich Abrikosov, who was the founder of the company now known as Babayevsky. His father, Ivan Alekseevich Abrikosov, was expected to take over the family firm until his premature death from tuberculosis. His siblings included future Tsarist diplomat Dmitry Abrikosov and future Catholic Sainthood Candidate Anna Abrikosova.

Although the younger members of the family rarely attended Divine Liturgy, the Abrikosovs regarded themselves as pillars of the Russian Orthodox Church.

Career
Abrokosov published works on the subject of the pathological morphology of tuberculosis and tumors, including the neuroectodermal tumor. This was described by Abrikosov as "myoblastomyoma." Based upon his work, this type of tumor was named "Abrikosov's tumor". He was the author of a multi-volume handbook in special pathology.

Embalming of Lenin 
On the morning of January 23, 1924, Abrikosov was given the task of embalming Lenin’s body to keep it intact until his burial. The body is still on permanent display in the Lenin's Mausoleum in Moscow.

Personal life
Aleksey Abrikosov was the father of Alexei Abrikosov, a theoretical physicist and a co-recipient of the 2003 Nobel Prize in Physics.

He died on April 9, 1955 in Moscow aged 80, and was buried at Novodevichy Cemetery.

In popular culture
Aleksey Abrikosov is believed to be the inspiration for Professor Persikov, the protagonist of Mikhail Bulgakov's novel Fatal Eggs. The character's name is a pun, as, in Russian, abrikos means "apricot" and persik means "peach".

Honors and awards
 Stalin Prize, first class (1942) - for scientific study "Private pathological anatomy. Part II: The heart and blood vessels", published in late 1940.
 Two Orders of Lenin
 Order of the Red Banner of Labour
 Hero of Socialist Labour (1945)

References

Bibliography

External links

Pathologists from the Russian Empire
Soviet pathologists
1875 births
1955 deaths
Heroes of Socialist Labour
Stalin Prize winners
Recipients of the Order of Lenin
Recipients of the Order of the Red Banner of Labour
Full Members of the USSR Academy of Sciences
Academicians of the USSR Academy of Medical Sciences
Burials at Novodevichy Cemetery
I.M. Sechenov First Moscow State Medical University alumni
Imperial Moscow University alumni
Professorships at the Imperial Moscow University
Academic staff of Moscow State University